Upland Arms is a village located in Carmarthenshire based along the A484 running between Carmarthen and Kidwelly.

Villages in Carmarthenshire